Flight of the Ancients is a 2011 album by The Shaolin Afronauts. It was nominated for several music awards, including the 25th ARIA Award in the world music category.

Track listing

Personnel 
Musicians and recording personnel:
Alto Saxophone – Chris Soole
Arranged By – Lachlan Ridge*, Ross McHenry
Baritone Saxophone, Bass Clarinet – Jon Hunt (2)
Bass – Ross McHenry
Congas – Tim Wilsdon
Design – Kano172
Drums – Kevin van der Zwaag
Guitar – Dylan Marshall, Kahil Nayton, Lachlan Ridge*
Mastered By – Pete Maher (2)
Mixed By – Tom Barnes (6)
Percussion – Joel Prime, Tim Bennett (2)
Producer – Ross McHenry
Recorded By – Corey Hosking (tracks: B1, B3), Gabriel Agostino (tracks: B1, B3), Tom Barnes (6) (tracks: A1 to A4, B1, B4)
Shekere, Percussion [Hand Percussion] – David van der Zwaag
Tenor Saxophone – Adam Page
Trumpet – Chris Weber (4)
Written-By – Lachlan Ridge* (tracks: A4), Ross McHenry (tracks: A1 to A3, B1 to B4)

References

External links
Worldcat entry

2011 albums
Afrobeat albums